Shir Ahan Shahr (also Romanized as Shīr Āhan Shahr and Shīrāhan-e Shahr; also known as Shīr Āhan) is a village in Kangan Rural District, in the Central District of Jask County, Hormozgan Province, Iran. At the 2006 census, its population was 82, in 20 families.

References 

Populated places in Jask County